Li'an Ocean Harbor Theme Park is a water park opened 22 December 2021 in Lingshui County, Hainan Province, China.

References

Buildings and structures under construction in China
Amusement parks in China
Buildings and structures in Hainan